Yokoya  may refer to:
 Yokoya Station, a train station in Mizuho, Gifu Prefecture, Japan
 Hanae Yokoya (born 1978), a Japanese figure skater
 Rancho Yokoya
 Yu Yokoya (18??-1967), a Japanese marine biologist